The following are the calling codes in Burundi.

Calling formats
To call in Burundi, the following format is used:

yy yy xxxx Calls inside Burundi

+257 yy yy xxxx Calls from outside Burundi

The NSN length is eight digits.

List of area codes in Burundi

List of mobile codes in Burundi

References

Burundi
Telecommunications in Burundi
Telephone numbers

25778806073
78806073